Boughrood Brest is a community in Glasbury-on-Wye, Powys, Wales, which is 39 miles (62 km) from Cardiff and 138 miles (222 km) from London. It lies close to the banks of the River Wye, between Boughrood itself and Glasbury.

References

See also 
 List of localities in Wales by population

Villages in Powys